Flo & Joan (or Flo and Joan, a name they took from their grandmother and her sister) is an English comedy music act consisting of sisters, Rosie and Nicola Dempsey. The act generally consists of comedy songs. Flo & Joan have been featured on BBC One's Live at the Apollo, Stamptown Comedy Night and Off Menu podcast. In 2018, they were featured in a Nationwide building society television advert.

They released an Amazon Prime Video special, Alive on Stage, based on their Edinburgh Fringe show in 2019.

Works

Tours

Comedy specials

Television

Awards
Leicester Comedy Festival Best Musical Act
Chortle Awards Best Music & Variety Act 2018
Toronto Sketch Comedy Festival, Audience Choice Award 2017

References

External links
 
 
 

British comedy musical groups
English musical duos
English expatriates in Canada
English people of Irish descent
Female musical duos
Musical groups established in the 2010s
Musical groups from Hampshire
Sibling musical duos
Sisters
English comedy duos